Stefanie Sun (born 23 July 1978) is a Singaporean singer-songwriter. In 2000, she released her debut album, Yan Zi, which won her a Golden Melody Award for Best New Artist. In 2004, she released her eighth studio album, Stefanie, which won her another Golden Melody Award for Best Mandarin Female Singer. Having sold more than 30 million records, she achieved popularity in Greater China and among the Chinese-speaking world.

Early life and education
Sun was born in Singapore on 23 July 1978. She attended Nanyang Primary School, St. Margaret's Secondary School, Raffles Girls' School, Saint Andrew's Junior College, and Nanyang Technological University, where she obtained a bachelor's degree of Marketing in 2000.

Singing career

Early years and 2000s
During university, Sun wrote her first song titled "Someone", which later appeared on her 2002 album, Start. She attended LWS School of Music, and her vocal talent was discovered by her mentor Paul Lee, who later introduced her to Samuel Chou, the chairman of Warner Music Taiwan at the time.

In 2002, Hong Kong-based Yazhou Zhoukan, published a 15-page article on the "Stefanie Sun phenomenon", citing the impact that her music had made on Asia.

Sun was selected to sing the English and Mandarin versions of the Singapore National Day Parade theme songs for 2002 – "We Will Get There" (一起走到) and 2003 – "One United People" (全心全意).

In 2006, National Parks Board of Singapore named an orchid, Dendrobium Stefanie Sun, after her.  Sun also has a wax figure of herself at the Madame Tussauds Singapore wax museum which portrays her signature look during her 2014 Kepler World Tour. The wax figure took around four months to make, costing $300,000 Singapore dollars.

2010s
Stefanie Sun revealed that her proudest moments as a singer was when she sang the favourite song of Kwa Geok Choo, wife of Singapore's former prime minister, Lee Kuan Yew, "Que Sera Sera", at the Business China Awards in 2011, not long after her demise. The song had moved Mr Lee, a person whom Sun had the highest respect for, to tears.

2020s
In early January 2020, she collaborated with Taiwanese band, Mayday, to release the new version of their 2000 hit "Tenderness".

On 27 May 2022, more than 240 million people watched Sun performed in a one hour virtual concert streamed on Douyin.

Personal life 
In May 2011, Sun married Nadim van der Ros, who is a Eurasian Indonesian and the founder of Be An Idea, a part of The Good Bean Consultancy. They had secretly registered their marriage in March 2011. In October 2012, Sun gave birth to her son, followed by a daughter in July 2018.

Discography
Studio albums
 Yan Zi (2000)
 My Desired Happiness (2000)
 Kite (2001)
 Start (2002)
 Leave (2002)
 To Be Continued... (2003)
 Stefanie (2004)
 A Perfect Day (2005)
 Against the Light (2007)
 It's Time (2011)
 Kepler (2014)
 No. 13 – A Dancing Van Gogh (2017)
Extended plays
 Rainbow Bot (2016)
Compilation albums
 The Moment (2003)
 My Story, Your Song (2006)
Live albums
 2000 Live Concert (2001)
 Start World Tour (2002)
Feature singles
 "Tenderness (2020 version)" (with Mayday) (2020)
 "Drunkard Ah Q" (with Sodagreen vocalist, Greeny Wu) (2022) from his third studio album Mallarme's Tuesdays

References

External links

 

 
 

1978 births
Living people
21st-century Singaporean women singers
Nanyang Technological University alumni
Raffles Girls' Secondary School alumni
Saint Andrew's Junior College alumni
Singaporean Mandopop singers
Singaporean people of Teochew descent
Singaporean singer-songwriters
Mandopop singer-songwriters